Staudte is a German surname.  Notable people with the surname include:
 Hans-Hilmar Staudte (1911–1979), German jurist and chess player
 Miriam Staudte (born 1975), German politician
 Wolfgang Staudte (1906–1984), German film director, script writer and actor

German-language surnames